Meghnagar is a census town, near Jhabua town in Jhabua district in the Indian state of Madhya Pradesh.

Demographics
 India census, Meghnagar had a population of 10,316. Males constitute 52% of the population and females 48%. Meghnagar has an average literacy rate of 62%, higher than the national average of 59.5%: male literacy is 69%, and female literacy is 54%. In Meghnagar, 18% of the population is under 6 years of age.

Meghnagar railway station falls in Western Railway zone and has stoppages of many important trains.

References

Cities and towns in Jhabua district
Jhabua